Swiftair S.A. is an airline headquartered in Madrid, Spain. It operates scheduled and charter, passenger and cargo flights in Europe, North Africa and the Middle East. Its main base is Madrid–Barajas Airport.

History

The airline was founded in 1986. It wholly owns subsidiary Mediterranean Air Freight. Currently Swiftair is also a United Nations contractor for the United Nations Mission in Sudan.

Fleet

Current fleet

The Swiftair fleet consists of the following aircraft:

Former fleet
Swiftair formerly operated the following aircraft:

Accidents and incidents
 In October 1994, one of its aircraft was written off when the crew forgot to lower the landing gear as the plane arrived in Madrid.
 In May 1995, another aircraft was damaged beyond repair during a botched landing at Vitoria airport in Spain.
 In 2005 a 727 operating for DHL sustained starboard wing damage due botched landing in Kandahar. It was repaired over the next 2 days and returned to Bahrain
 In January 2012, a plane sustained substantial damage during a botched landing at Kandahar. 
 On July 24, 2014, a McDonnell Douglas MD-83 operated by the company performed scheduled flight AH5017 from Ouagadougou to Algiers for Algerian airline Air Algérie. The aircraft disappeared off radar 50 minutes after takeoff and crashed in Gossi, Mali, killing all 116 people on board.
 On January 18, 2016, an Embraer 120 freighter took out runway edge lights during its takeoff roll at Amsterdam Schiphol airport, on a flight to London Stansted. No injuries occurred.
 On November 17, 2016, a Boeing 737-400 registration EC-MAD, was flying on behalf of EAT Leipzig out of Shannon Airport when the pilots reported shortly after liftoff that they had lost all instrumentation. The crew remained in visual contact with the airport and returned for a safe landing.
 On September 24, 2022, a Boeing 737-400SF registration EC-NLS, experienced a runway excursion at Montpellier-Méditerranée Airport, France. After breaking through the barriers, the plane ended its journey in the waters of the Étang de l'Or. There were no injuries among the three crew members.

See also
List of airlines of Spain

References

External links

Official website

Companies based in the Community of Madrid
Airlines of Spain
Airlines established in 1986
1986 establishments in Spain